Julius H. Soble was a member of the Massachusetts House of Representatives. He was born in 1898 He was from Ward 14 in Dorchester. In 1931, he was the youngest member of the House. A lawyer, he was admitted to practice in federal courts.

See also
 1931–1932 Massachusetts legislature
 1933–1934 Massachusetts legislature

References

People from Dorchester, Massachusetts
Lawyers from Boston
Members of the Massachusetts House of Representatives
1898 births
Year of death missing